Ice hockey was featured as part of the 2003 Asian Winter Games.

Japan won the men's event by defeating all of the other teams, Kazakhstan also won all its games until they lost the final game to Japan. China took third position after beating South Korea. Thailand got fifth place and Mongolia got sixth place after losing all its games.

In women's ice hockey, Kazakhstan won all its games and the gold medal, in a league system with five teams playing. Japan won the silver medal, and China the bronze. North Korea took fourth place and the South Korea was in fifth place.

Schedule

Medalists

Medal table

Final standing

Men

Women

References

External links
 The 5th Winter Asian Games	AOMORI 2003
Japan Ice Hockey Men
Japan Ice Hockey Women

 
2003 Asian Winter Games events
2003
Winter
2003
Asian